Heike Hartwig (born 30 December 1962 in Bernburg, Bezirk Halle) is a retired East German shot putter.

She represented the sports club SC Dynamo Berlin, and became East German championships in 1987, 1989 and 1990.

Her personal best throw was 21.31 metres, achieved in May 1988 in Athens. This ranks her seventh among German shot putters, behind Ilona Slupianek, Claudia Losch, Marianne Adam, Margitta Droese, Ines Müller and Eva Wilms.

Achievements

References

External links

1962 births
Living people
People from Bernburg
People from Bezirk Halle
East German female shot putters
Sportspeople from Saxony-Anhalt
Olympic athletes of East Germany
Athletes (track and field) at the 1988 Summer Olympics